George Shelby Friedrichs Jr. (February 15, 1940 in New Orleans – March 20, 1991), known as "Buddy", was an American sailor and Olympic champion. He was Dragon Class World Champion in 1967 before competing at the 1968 Summer Olympics in Mexico City (sailing events in Acapulco, where he received a gold medal in the Dragon class as helmsman on the red-painted boat WILLIWAW. Serving as crew members on WILLIWAW were Gerald "Click" Schreck and Barton Jahncke.

See also
 List of Olympic medalists in Dragon class sailing

References

External links
 
 
 

1940 births
1991 deaths
Sportspeople from New Orleans
American male sailors (sport)
Sailors at the 1968 Summer Olympics – Dragon
Olympic gold medalists for the United States in sailing
Medalists at the 1968 Summer Olympics